Fengxin County is a county in the northwest of Jiangxi province, People's Republic of China. It is under the jurisdiction of the prefecture-level city of Yichun.

Administrative divisions
In the present, Fengxin County has 10 towns and 3 townships. 
10 towns

3 townships
 Yangshan
 Zaoxi
 Liuxi

Demographics 

Climate

Notes and references

External links
  Government site - 

County-level divisions of Jiangxi